Story of Barbara is a 1967 Danish film directed by Palle Kjærulff-Schmidt. It was entered into the 17th Berlin International Film Festival.

Cast
 Yvonne Ingdal as Barbara
 Peter Steen as Finn
 Ejner Federspiel as Barbara's Father
 Jørgen Buckhøj as Jørgen
 Hans Stephensen as Werner
 Lars Lunøe as Kjeld
 Thomas Nissen as Tom
 Allan De Waal as Gulle

References

External links

1967 films
1960s Danish-language films
Danish black-and-white films
Films directed by Palle Kjærulff-Schmidt